Traditional Italian maize varieties have been, according to historical, archaeological, botany, morphological, and genetic evidence, molded since the introduction of this exotic cereal crop from the Americas in the sixteenth century.

History
The speciation and evolution of maize varieties in Italy, by means of man-made adaptive selection, maintained a broad genetic variability for about four centuries. Traditional varieties and ecotypes were sown in the diversified ecological regions of Italy until the introduction of Corn Belt hybrids in the twentieth century presented outstanding ecological adaptation, yield and cooking characteristics.

Most Italian agro-ecotypes of maize are from the Indurata and Indentata sections and their combinations, characterized by kernels with flint, semi-dent and dent consistency. A few local varieties from the Everta section (pop-corn) were also grown in Italy. The kernel apex can take different shapes: smooth, horned, cuspidate, rostrum-like or indented.

The eco-agronomic characteristics of Italian traditional varieties match the Mediterranean and semi-continental climate of the country, with mostly spring and some summer (post-wheat) sowings; and early (summer) to late (autumn) maturity.

Classification
Classification, along the plant cropping and grain cooking characteristics, is summed in the following ear types;
Eight-rows (ottofile),
Large conic
Long-ear cylindric,
Polirows-subconic,
Short-cycle dwarf conic.

An early description of 12 maize varieties was published by P. Venino in 1916, followed by extensive studies by Tito Vezio Zapparoli between 1920 and 1943. An extensive collection of 562 seed samples of local varieties was collected in 1954-1955 by Aureliano Brandolini.

The agronomic, morphological and cytological characterization, and multi-variate analysis, of such and other accessions stored at the germplasm bank of the "Maize experimental station" in Bergamo, allowed the systematic classification of Italian traditional varieties.

According to such classification, Italian traditional maize varieties are:

Sections Indurata and Indentata (9 racial complexes, 35 races & 65 agro-ecotypes)
Eight-rowed flints and derived races: 6 races and 10 agro-ecotypes
Ottofile puri (true eight-rows)
Ottofile
Ottofile tardivo
Tajolone
Razze derivate (derivative races)
Cannellino
Derivati 12-14 file
Monachello
Conical flints and derived races: 5 races and 15 agro-ecotypes
Barbina
Biancone
Montano
Ostesa
Poliranghi
Late Southern cylindrical flints: 3 races and 4 agro-ecotypes
Montoro
Pannaro
Rodindia
Midseason Southern cylindrical flints: 3 races and 6 agro-ecotypes
Altosiculo
Dindico
Trentinella
Extra-early dwarf flints: 4 races and 6 agro-ecotypes
Agostinello
Poliota
Tirolese
Trenodi
Microsperma flints: 4 races e 8 agro-ecotypes
Appenniniche
Zeppetello
Subalpine
Cadore
Cinquantino Marano
Quarantino estivo
Padanians: 4 races and 7 agro-ecotypes
Poliranghi
Bani-Scaiola
Pignolo
Rostrato-Scagliolo
Longispiga
Agostano
Pearl white flints: 3 races and 4 agro-ecotypes
Bianco Perla
Cimalunga
Righetta bianco
Dent corn: 2 races and 5 agro-ecotypes
Dentati bianchi antichi
Dentati moderni
Section Everta
Pop corn: 3 races and 12 agro-ecotypes
Bianco tardivo cremonese
Perla prolifico
Risiforme precoce

Future
Genetic erosion is a menace to the basis of further improvement for a monoic, allogamous species, Zea mays L., whose genetic progress is mainly founded on the combination of the structural and physiological traits, contributed by each parental genotype, and a hazard to the specific qualities of different maize varieties, selected throughout the centuries as a major element for each peculiar meal involving maize derivates.

See also
Consiglio per la ricerca e la sperimentazione in agricoltura

References

Maize varieties
Agriculture in Italy
Maize varieties